Hydrocotyle laxiflora is a species of plant in the family Araliaceae.

Description

Range

Habitat

Ecology

Etymology

Taxonomy

References

laxiflora